Van den Broek is a Dutch toponymic surname, meaning "from the marshes". Variant spellings include Van den Broeck, Van den Broeke, and Vandebroek. People with this surname include:
 Antonius van den Broek (1870–1926), Dutch lawyer and physicist known for defining the atomic number
 Barbara van den Broek (1932 – 2001), New Zealand-born Australian architect and landscape architect
 Benjamin van den Broek (born 1987), New Zealand footballer
 Dirk van den Broek (born 1924), Dutch businessman
 Elias van den Broek (1649–1708), Dutch Golden Age flower painter
 Hans van den Broek (born 1936), Dutch Minister of Foreign Affairs
 Irene van den Broek (born 1980), Dutch cyclist
 Jacques van den Broek (born 1960), Dutch businessman, CEO of Randstad Holding
 Jan Karel van den Broek (1814–1865), Dutch physician in Japan
 Jo van den Broek (1898–1978), Dutch architect
 Johannes van den Broek (1882–1946), Dutch businessman and Minister of Finance
 John van den Broek (1894/1895–1918) Dutch cinematographer who died while filming
 Klaas van den Broek (born 1955), Dutch ice hockey player
 Koen van den Broek (born 1973), Belgian painter
 Marc van den Broek (born 1953), Belgian painter and sculptor
 Marilène van den Broek (born 1970), Dutch princess
 Marleen van den Broek (born 1971), Dutch singer and presenter known as Marlayne
 Nanja van den Broek (born 1975), Dutch freediver
 Roel van den Broek (born 1931), Dutch religious history scholar
 Theo van den Broek (born 1930s), New Zealand football player
 Theodore J. Van den Broek (1783–1851), Dutch Dominican missionary to the United States
Van den Broeke
 Marnix van den Broeke (born 1976), Dutch actor
Vandebroek
Sophie Vandebroek (born 1962), Belgian electrical engineer and business executive

See also 
 Broek (disambiguation)
 Vandenbroek, Wisconsin, a town in Outagamie County

References

Dutch-language surnames
Surnames of Dutch origin